Arch Street is a major east-west street in Center City Philadelphia, Pennsylvania.

History
The street was called Mulberry Street in William Penn's original city grid, but it was renamed Arch in 1854. Other parts of the street were once called Holme and Tioga streets. 

In the 1950s and 1960s, Arch from 6th to 11th Streets was known as "Radio Row", after its electronic-goods stores.

Present
Arch Street presently runs from the Delaware River one way westbound through Old City, where landmarks include the Arch Street Friends Meeting House, the Betsy Ross House, Girard Fountain Park, the U.S. Mint, and Christ Church Burial Ground. It crosses Independence Mall at 5th and 6th Streets, and traverses Philadelphia's Chinatown (Philadelphia) neighborhood.  

The tourist areas around Logan Square and the museum district are just north of Arch Street, which ends just east of the Schuylkill River at 23rd Street. West of the river, there is a block of Arch Street between 30th Street Station and Cira Centre. Arch Street also runs eastbound one-way from 49th Street to 63rd Street.

Notes

Streets in Philadelphia
History of Philadelphia